The 1920 Illinois Fighting Illini football team was an American football team that represented the University of Illinois during the 1920 college football season.  In their eighth season under head coach Robert Zuppke, the Illini compiled a 5–2 record and finished in fourth place in the Big Ten Conference. Center J. C. Depler was the team captain.

Schedule

Awards and honors
Chuck Carney, (End)
Consensus All-American, End
Albert Mohr, (Guard)
All-American, Guard
Jack Depler, (Center)
All-American, Center
Jack Crangle
All-American, Fullback

References

Illinois
Illinois Fighting Illini football seasons
Illinois Fighting Illini football